Sulfur sticks are used in industrial ammonia refrigeration systems to detect minor ammonia leaks. A sulfur stick is made from a wick which contains particles of sulfur. 

The sulfur stick is lit and smolders, something like the taper that is used to light fireworks. The color of the sulfur smoke is used to find the leak.  When there is no ammonia the smoke is colorless but when ammonia is present the combined sulfur and ammonia vapors produce a white smoke.

Sulfur sticks have been used to find ammonia leaks for at least 100 years.

Heating, ventilation, and air conditioning